The Little Popo Agie River runs through unincorporated portions of Fremont County Wyoming. The river's headwaters are at Christina Lake in the Wind River Range, and it flows a total of  until its end near Hudson, Wyoming. The river is one of three sharing the name "Popo Agie", the others include the Middle Fork Popo Agie and the North Fork Popo Agie River.

Course

History
During the 19th Century, areas along the river were the site of violent encounters between the U.S. Army and Native Americans. On July 1, 1875, an  army cavalry detachment documented killing two Native Americans near the river.

Pollution

Since at least the early 20th Century, some sections of the river have had problems with pollution thought to have come from industrial operations at nearby oil extraction sites. Around 1907, sufficient oil waste was reportedly being dumped into the Little Popo Agie River. This led to several lawsuits being filed for damages by locals using the river's water for irrigation against oil companies operating in the area. Pollution from oil waste was linked to decreased fish habitat on the river in the 1950s.

References

Rivers of Wyoming